Blood Will Out: The True Story of a Murder, a Mystery, and a Masquerade  is a 2014 memoir by Walter Kirn. It describes his experiences being a close friend to a man he knew as Clark Rockefeller, who claimed to be the scion of the notable Rockefeller family in the US. In reality, Clark Rockefeller was an alias and he was really Christian Gerhartsreiter, a German immigrant to the United States who had been working as a con man for over 20 years, and who was soon to be convicted of murder.

References

2014 non-fiction books
American memoirs
Boni & Liveright books